This article contains a list of fossil-bearing stratigraphic units in the state of Massachusetts, U.S.

Sites

See also

 Paleontology in Massachusetts

References

 

Massachusetts
Stratigraphic units
Stratigraphy of Massachusetts
Massachusetts geography-related lists
United States geology-related lists